The Order of the Lion of Finland is one of three official orders in Finland, along with the Order of the Cross of Liberty and the Order of the White Rose of Finland. The President of Finland is the Grand Master of all three orders. The orders are administered by boards consisting of a chancellor, a vice-chancellor and at least four members. The orders of the White Rose of Finland and the Lion of Finland have a joint board. The President of Finland wears the Star of the Order of the Lion of Finland.

History 
The Order of the Lion of Finland was established on September 11, 1942. At that time, Finland was waging the Continuation War. Wartime diplomacy included a heightened need to decorate particularly foreigners from aligned countries, chiefly Germany. The existing Finnish orders – the Order of the Cross of Liberty and the Order of the White Rose of Finland – could not keep up with the decorations and their highest grades were in danger to become inflated due to too many holders. The Order of the Lion of Finland was thus established to allow the continuation of decorating foreigners with high ranks in Finnish orders, although the Order of the Lion of Finland can also be awarded to Finnish nationals. The new order also allowed for more flexible decorations, taking in account the rank and achievements of the recipients.

In January 1998 President Martti Ahtisaari was criticized by some NGOs, politicians and notable cultural figures because he awarded Commander of the Order of the Lion of Finland to Djamaludin Suryohadikusumo, the Forest Minister of Indonesia, and to Sukanto Tanoto, the main owner of the Indonesian RGM Company, a parent company of the April Company. The April Company was criticized by non-governmental organisations for destroying rainforests, and Indonesia itself was criticized heavily for human right violations, especially in East Timor. Ahtisaari's party chairman Erkki Tuomioja said that giving the medals was questionable since he feared the act may tarnish the public image of Finnish human rights policy. Students of the arts had demonstrations in Helsinki against the decision to give medals. Artist  and author Leena Krohn returned their Pro Finlandia medals to protest the Indonesian decorations.

Finnish Olympic and Paralympic medalists are awarded Knight or Knight, First Class, with clasps.

Ambassadors accredited to Helsinki leaving their post are given the Grand Cross provided that their country also awards medals reciprocally.

Classes 
The classes of the Order of the Lion of Finland are: 

 Commander Grand Cross of the Order of the Lion of Finland 
 Commander, First Class, of the Order of the Lion of Finland 
 Commander of the Order of the Lion of Finland 
 Pro Finlandia Medal of the Order of the Lion of Finland (awarded to artists and writers)
 Knight, First Class, of the Order of the Lion of Finland 
 Knight of the Order of the Lion of Finland 
 Cross of Merit of the Order of the Lion of Finland

Recipients

Grand Cross

  Risto Ryti (1942)
  Aimo Cajander (1942)
  Harri Holma (1942)
   (1942)
  Lauri Malmberg (1942)
  Oskari Mantere (1942)
  Karl Ivan Westman (1942)
  , with swords (1942)
  Herbert Backe (1942)
   (1942)
  Noti Constantinide (1942)
  Vincenzo Cicconardi (1942)
  Heikki Renvall (1942)
  Aarno Yrjö-Koskinen (1942)
  Nicolas Petzeff (1943)
  Alfréd Nickl (1943)
  Antti Tulenheimo (1943)
  , with swords (1943)
  , with swords (1943)
  Ilie Șteflea, with swords (1943)
  Hubert Guerin (1943)
  Gheorghe Davidescu (1943)
   (1943)
  Karl Fiehler (1943)
  Hartmann Lauterbacher (1943)
  Artur Axmann (1943)
  Alexander von Dörnberg (1943)
  Octav Ullea (1943)
  Gösta Bagge (1943)
   (1943)
  Agâh Aksel (1943)
  Werner Lorenz (1943)
   (1943)
  G. A. Gripenberg (1943)
  Onni Talas (1943)
  Jenő Szinyei Merse (1944)
  Ferenc Szombathelyi, with swords (1944)
  Lajos Csatay, with swords (1944)
  Gustaf Lindström (1944)
  Axel Rappe (1944)
  Karl Weisenberger, with swords (1944)
  Carl Gustaf Emil Mannerheim, with swords (1944)
  Leo Ehrnrooth (1944)
  Ernst von Born (1944)
  Paavo Hynninen (1944)
  Gustaf Idman (1944)
  , with swords (1945)
  Woldemar Hägglund, with swords (1945)
  , with swords (1945)
  Hugo Österman, with swords (1945)
   (1945)
  José de Palafox, 3rd Duke of Zaragoza (1945)

  Helge Söderbom (1946)
   (1946)
  Max von Bonsdorff (1946)
   (1946)
  Berndt Grönblom (1946)
   (1946)
  Juho Kusti Paasikivi (1946)
   (1946)
  Eliel Saarinen (1946)
   (1946)
   (1946)
   (1946)
  Albert von Hellens (1946)
   (1946)
   (1947)
   (1947)
   (1947)
   (1947)

  Zygmunt Modzelewski (1948)
  Hilary Minc (1948)
   (1948)
   (1948)
  Iivari Toivanen (1948)
  Josef Pavlovský (1949)
   (1949)
  Jan Wasilewski (1949)
  Rainer von Fieandt (1949)
  Hans Fuglsang-Damgaard (1949)
  Armas Järnefelt (1949)
  Gustaf Nobel (1949)
  Emil Aaltonen (1949)
   (1949)
  Hjalmar Granfelt (1949)
  Oskari Wilho Louhivuori (1949)
   (1949)
   (1950)
  Archbishop Herman (1950)
   (1950)
   (1950)
   (1951)
  Wilhelm Wahlforss (1951)
   (1951)
   (1952)
   (1952)
  Erik von Frenckell (1952)
  Vilho Ebeling (1952)
   (1952)
   (1952)
  Kyösti Haataja (1953)
  Torbjörn Seippel (1953)
   (1953)
  Mikko Louhivaara (1953)
  Pekka Myrberg (1953)
  Juho Niukkanen (1953)
  Artturi Ilmari Virtanen (1953)
  Aarne Wuorimaa (1953)
  Bruno Kivikoski (1954)
  Marcus Wallenberg Jr. (1954)
   (1954)
  Kaarlo Heiskanen (1954)
   (1954)
   (1954)
   (1954)
   (1954)
   (1955)
   (1955)
   (1955)
  Arturo Toscanini (1955)
   (1955)
   (1955)
  Urho Kekkonen (1956)
   (1956)
  Torsten Friis (1956)
   (1956)
  Hugo Cederschiöld (1956)
   (1956)
  Gustaf Dyrssen (1956)
  Onni Okkonen (1956)
  Veikko Antero Koskenniemi (1956)
   (1957)
   (1957)
  Eduard Palin (1957)

See also 
Orders, decorations, and medals of Finland

References

Works cited

Further reading

External links

11.9.1942/747 Decree. On the establishment of the Order of the Lion of Finland. Finlex. 
ritarikunnat.fi
The Office of the President of the Republic of Finland (Decorations) 

 
Lion of Finland, Order of
Awards established in 1942
1942 establishments in Finland